The Potts Creek Rockshelter Archeological Site, within Hoosier National Forest in Crawford County, Indiana, was a camp for Archaic, Woodland, and Paleo-Indian Indians.  It is currently unoccupied by habitation.

It was listed on the National Register of Historic Places in 1987.

See also
List of archaeological sites on the National Register of Historic Places in Indiana

References

External links

Paleo-Indian archaeological sites in the United States
Archaic period in North America
Woodland period
National Register of Historic Places in Crawford County, Indiana
Archaeological sites on the National Register of Historic Places in Indiana
Archaeological sites in Indiana
Geography of Crawford County, Indiana
Hoosier National Forest
Rock shelters in the United States